Jonathan Kabasele Bijimine (born 9 July 1994) is a footballer who plays as a defender or a midfielder. Born in France, he represents DR Congo at international level.

Club career
Born in Amiens to Congolese parents, Bijimine graduated with CS Sedan Ardennes' youth setup, and made his senior debuts with the reserves in the 2012–13 campaign, in CFA 2. On 19 October 2012 he played his first match as a professional, coming on as a second-half substitute in a 4–2 home success against AC Arles-Avignon for the Ligue 2 championship.

Bijimine appeared in 14 matches for the first team during the season (seven starts, 690 minutes of action), as his side were relegated. On 23 July 2013 he signed a three-year deal with Italian Lega Pro Prima Divisione side A.C. Perugia Calcio.

On 31 January 2014, after appearing rarely for Perugia, Bijimine was loaned to S.S. Barletta Calcio until June. On 3 September he moved teams and countries again, joining Spanish side Córdoba CF, and being assigned to the reserves in Segunda División B.

On 23 May 2015 Bijimine made his La Liga debut, coming on as a second-half substitute for Fede Vico in a 0–3 away loss against SD Eibar, as the Andalusians were already relegated. On 1 July of the following year, he signed a new three-year contract with the Verdiblancos and was definitely promoted to the main squad.

Bijimine became a regular starter under José Luis Oltra and Luis Carrión, but after being tested positive in a blood alcohol test following a car accident on 7 February 2017, he was only rarely used. On 20 July, he cut ties with the club.

On 15 March 2019, after spells with FC Fastav Zlín and UD Logroñés, Bijimine joined Segunda División B side Salamanca CF; seven days later, however, the club stated that he could not play due to being already registered to a French amateur club near his hometown.

On 6 August 2019, Bijimine joined fellow third division side UD San Sebastián de los Reyes, on loan from AD Alcorcón. The following 21 January, he moved to fellow league team Algeciras CF also in a temporary deal.

International career
After representing DR Congo at under-20 level, Bijimine was included in Florent Ibenge's 31-man squad ahead of 2017 Africa Cup of Nations on 23 December 2016, but was later cut from the final list. He made his full international debut with the main squad the following 26 March, replacing Wilson Kamavuaka in 1–2 friendly loss at Kenya.

Career statistics

References

External links

1994 births
Living people
Sportspeople from Amiens
French sportspeople of Democratic Republic of the Congo descent
Citizens of the Democratic Republic of the Congo through descent
French footballers
Democratic Republic of the Congo footballers
Association football defenders
Association football midfielders
La Liga players
Segunda División players
Segunda División B players
Tercera División players
Córdoba CF B players
Córdoba CF players
UD Logroñés players
UD San Sebastián de los Reyes players
Algeciras CF footballers
Super League Greece players
Apollon Smyrnis F.C. players
Czech First League players
FC Fastav Zlín players
Democratic Republic of the Congo under-20 international footballers
Democratic Republic of the Congo international footballers
French expatriate footballers
Democratic Republic of the Congo expatriate footballers
French expatriate sportspeople in Italy
French expatriate sportspeople in Spain
French expatriate sportspeople in Greece
French expatriate sportspeople in the Czech Republic
Democratic Republic of the Congo expatriate sportspeople in Italy
Democratic Republic of the Congo expatriate sportspeople in Spain
Expatriate footballers in Italy
Expatriate footballers in Spain
Expatriate footballers in Greece
Expatriate footballers in the Czech Republic
Black French sportspeople
Footballers from Hauts-de-France
Democratic Republic of the Congo expatriate sportspeople in Greece
Democratic Republic of the Congo expatriate sportspeople in the Czech Republic